The North Korea men's national under-18 ice hockey team is the men's national under-18 ice hockey team of North Korea. The team is controlled by the Ice Hockey Association of the DPR Korea, a member of the International Ice Hockey Federation. The team represents North Korea at the IIHF World U18 Championships. At the IIHF Asian Oceanic U18 Championships, the team won two gold, one silver, and one bronze medal.

International competitions

IIHF Asian Oceanic U18 Championships

1987:  1st place
1991:  3rd place
1992:  2nd place
1999: 1st in Division II
2000:  1st place

IIHF World U18 Championships

2001: 8th in Division I

External links
North Korea at IIHF.com

under
National under-18 ice hockey teams